Angaria is a genus of sea snails, marine gastropod mollusks in the family Angariidae. Angaria is the only genus in the family Angariidae.

Taxonomy 
According to the taxonomy of the Gastropoda by Bouchet & Rocroi, 2005, Angaria belongs in the subfamily Angariinae, within the family Turbinidae. Williams et al. (2008) moved Angaria to the family Angariidae within the newly created superfamily Angarioidea.

Species 
Species in the genus Angaria include:
 Angaria aculeata (Reeve, 1843)
 Angaria carmencita Günther, 2007
 † Angaria complanata Gain, Belliard & Le Renard, 2018 
 † Angaria constantinensis Gain, Belliard & Le Renard, 2018 
 Angaria delphinus (Linnaeus, 1758)
 Angaria formosa (Reeve, 1843)
 Angaria fratrummonsecourorum Günther, 2013
 Angaria guntheri Thach, 2018
 † Angaria gwynae Allison, 1955
 † Angaria gymna (Cossmann & Pissarro, 1902)
 Angaria javanica K. Monsecour & D. Monsecour, 1999
 Angaria kronenbergi Thach, 2018
 Angaria lilianae (K. Monsecour & D. Monsecour, 2000) Published in GloriaMaris.
 Angaria loebbeckei (Günther, 2022)
 Angaria melanacantha (Reeve, 1842)
 Angaria monsecourorum Thach, 2016
 Angaria moolenbeeki Thach, 2018
 Angaria nasui Thach, 2016
 Angaria neglecta Poppe & Goto, 1993
 Angaria neocaledonica Günther, 2016
 Angaria nhatrangensis Dekker, 2006
 † Angaria nigellensis Gain, Belliard & Le Renard, 2018 
 Angaria nodosa (Reeve, 1843)
 † Angaria pakistanica Eames, 1952
 Angaria petuchi Thach, 2018
 † Angaria polyphylla (d'Orbigny, 1850) 
 Angaria poppei (K. Monsecour & D. Monsecour, 1999)
 † Angaria proviliacensis Pacaud, 2017 
 † Angaria regleyana (Deshayes, 1824)
 † Angaria reynieri (Cossmann, 1913) 
 Angaria rubrovaria Günther, 2016
 Angaria rugosa (Kiener, 1873)
 Angaria scalospinosa Günther, 2016
 † Angaria scobina (Brongniart, 1823) 
 † Angaria scutellata Gain, Belliard & Le Renard, 2018 
 Angaria sphaerula (L. C. Kiener, 1839)
 † Angaria subcalcar D'Orbigny, 1850
 Angaria turpini K. Monsecour & D. Monsecour, 2006
 Angaria tyria (Reeve, 1842)
 Angaria vicdani (S. Kosuge, 1980)
 Angaria walleri Thach, 2018
Species brought into synonymy
 Angaria atrata (Gmelin, 1791) : synonym of Euchelus atratus (Gmelin, 1791)
 Angaria distorta (Linnaeus, 1758) : synonym of Angaria delphinus (Linnaeus, 1758)
 Angaria doncieuxi Villatte, 1964 † : synonym of Angaria subcalcar (d'Orbigny, 1850) †
 Angaria evoluta (L. Reeve, 1843) : synonym of Liotia evoluta (L. Reeve, 1843)
 Angaria laciniata (Lamarck, 1816), synonym of Angaria delphinus (Linnaeus, 1758)
 Angaria lacunosa Barnard, 1963 : synonym of Stephopoma lacunosum (Barnard, 1963) (original combination)
 Angaria plicata (Kiener, 1838) : synonym of Angaria rugosa (Kiener, 1838)
 Angaria valensis Plaziat, 1970 † : synonym of Angaria subcalcar (d'Orbigny, 1850) †

References
 Williams S.T., Karube S. & Ozawa T. (2008) Molecular systematics of Vetigastropoda: Trochidae, Turbinidae and Trochoidea redefined. Zoologica Scripta 37: 483–506

Further reading 
 Poppe, G. & Goto, Y. Recent Angariidae. Monstra Mondiale Malacologia. Cupra Marittima. 32 pp., 10 pls.
 Vaught, K.C. (1989). A classification of the living Mollusca. American Malacologists: Melbourne, FL (USA). . XII, 195 pp.

External links
 Röding P.F. (1798). Museum Boltenianum sive Catalogus cimeliorum e tribus regnis naturæ quæ olim collegerat Joa. Fried Bolten, M. D. p. d. per XL. annos proto physicus Hamburgensis. Pars secunda continens Conchylia sive Testacea univalvia, bivalvia & multivalvia. Trapp, Hamburg. viii, 199 pp.
 Lamarck [J.B.P.A. de. (1804). Suite des mémoires sur les fossiles des environs de Paris. Annales du Muséum d'Histoire Naturelle. 5: 28-36; 91-98; 179-188; 237-245; pl. 59-62]
 Marshall, B. A. (1979). The Trochidae and Turbinidae of the Kermadec Ridge (Mollusca: Gastropoda). New Zealand Journal of Zoology. 6: 521-552

Angariidae

Gastropod genera